The black-throated prinia (Prinia atrogularis) is a species of bird in the family Cisticolidae.
It is found in the eastern Himalayas and southwestern China.

References

Prinia
Birds of Bhutan
Birds described in 1854